is a Japanese professional shogi player ranked 8-dan. He is also a non-executive director of the Japan Shogi Association.

Early life
Sugimoto was born on November 13, 1968, in Nagoya, Japan. In 1980, he finished third in the 5th  and entered the Japan Shogi Association's apprentice school that same year at the rank 6-kyū under the guidance of shogi professional .

Sugimoto was promoted to the rank of 1-dan in 1985 before obtaining full professional status and the rank of 4-dan in October 1990 after finishing the 7th 3-dan League (April 1990September 1990) with a record of 13 wins and 5 losses.

Shogi professional
Sugimoto became the 57th professional shogi player to win 600 official games when he defeated Satoru Sakaguchi in a preliminary round game of the 72nd Ōshō Tournament on January 28, 2022.

Promotion history
The promotion history for Sugimoto is as follows.
 6-kyū: August 1980
 1-dan: February 1985
 4-dan: October 1, 1990
 5-dan: December 6, 1995
 6-dan: July 11, 2000
 7-dan: February 10, 2006
 8-dan: February 22, 2019

Awards and honors
Sugimoto received the Japan Shogi Association's "25 Years Service Award" in 2015 in recognition of being an active professional for twenty-five years. He received the Shogi Honor Award in January 2022 for winning 600 games since turning professional.

JSA director
Sugimoto is a member of the Japan Shogi Association's board of directors. He was elected to a two-year term as a non-executive director at the association's 63rd General Meeting in June 2012, and then again in June 2021.

References

External links
ShogiHub: Professional Player Info · Sugimoto, Masataka

Japanese shogi players
Living people
Professional shogi players
People from Nagoya
Professional shogi players from Aichi Prefecture
1968 births